Forbidden Adventure, also known as Newly Rich, is a 1931 American pre-Code comedy film directed by Norman Taurog and starring Mitzi Green, Edna May Oliver, Louise Fazenda and Jackie Searl. Three children - two actors and a king - run away from their constricted lives and have a forbidden adventure. Filming took place from April 2 to May 7, 1931.

Cast
 Mitzi Green as Daisy Tate
 Edna May Oliver as Bessie Tate
 Louise Fazenda as Maggie Tiffany
 Jackie Searl as Tiny Tim
 Bruce Line as King Maximilian
 Virginia Hammond as Queen Sedonia
 Lawrence Grant as Equerry
 Dell Henderson as Director

References

External links

1931 films
American black-and-white films
1930s English-language films
Films about actors
Films based on works by Sinclair Lewis
Films directed by Norman Taurog
Films with screenplays by Joseph L. Mankiewicz
1931 comedy films
American comedy films
1930s American films